H. Ajmal Khan was an Indian politician and former Member of Parliament elected from Tamil Nadu. He was elected to the Lok Sabha from Periyakulam constituency as a Swatantra Party candidate in the 1967 election.

References

Tamil Nadu politicians
Year of birth missing (living people)
Living people
Swatantra Party politicians
India MPs 1967–1970
Lok Sabha members from Tamil Nadu
People from Theni district